The 1940 Stanley Cup Finals was a best-of-seven series between the New York Rangers and the Toronto Maple Leafs. New York would win the series 4–2 to win their third Stanley Cup. The Rangers would not win another for 54 years, a circumstance termed the curse of 1940.

Paths to the Finals
New York defeated the Boston Bruins in a best-of-seven 4–2 to advance to the Finals. The Maple Leafs had to play two best-of three series; winning 2–0 against the Chicago Black Hawks, and 2–0 against the Detroit Red Wings to advance to the Finals.

Game summaries
The Finals series between the Rangers and the Maple Leafs was an exciting one that went back and forth with three overtime games. The Rangers took the first two at home and the Leafs took the next two in Toronto.
The circus forced the Rangers to vacate Madison Square Garden after the first two games. The Rangers would score three game-winning goals in overtime including the Cup winner. Lynn and Murray Patrick played for the Rangers to become the third and fourth members of the Patrick family to win the Stanley Cup.

Stanley Cup engraving
The 1940 Stanley Cup was presented to Rangers captain Art Coulter by NHL President Frank Calder following the Rangers 3–2 overtime win over the Maple Leafs in game six.

The following Rangers players and staff had their names engraved on the Stanley Cup

1939–40 New York Rangers

See also
 1939–40 NHL season

References and notes

Notes

References

Stanley Cup Finals″
Stanley Cup Finals
New York Rangers games
Toronto Maple Leafs games
Stanley Cup Finals
Stanley Cup Finals
Stanley Cup Finals
Ice hockey competitions in Toronto
1940s in Toronto
1940s in Manhattan